WONQ (1030 AM) is a radio station broadcasting a Spanish Variety format. Licensed to Oviedo, Florida, United States, it serves the Orlando area.  The station is currently owned by Q Broadcasting Corporation.  From 2019 until 2021, the station was simulcast on translator W258DD Orlando at 99.5 FM, and was branded as "Viva FM."

The station changed formats from Spanish News/Talk on April 29, 2019, with George Mier returning as Program Director.

The station also airs Orlando Magic basketball games and Orlando City SC soccer matches in Spanish.

As of December 31, 2021, WONQ flipped back to its previous Spanish news/talk format (while also playing Spanish-language oldies and rock/pop music) and under its former name "La Grande 1030", while the salsa music format moved to WVVO.

External links
Official website

ONQ
ONQ